Warren Stanlake (born 3 September 1958) is  a former Australian rules footballer who played with Footscray in the Victorian Football League (VFL). 

His son Billy Stanlake is an international cricketer.

References

External links

1958 births
Australian rules footballers from New South Wales
Living people
Lavington Football Club players
Western Bulldogs players